Kamel Nitrate are a British band that creates musical fusion. The members fuse together many genres, most notably world, trip hop, jazz and drum and bass. They are backed by the Whirl-Y-Gig.

Andy Kershaw has hailed the group as "the future in world music". Their first album Lost in Spice has been critically acclaimed by music magazines such as Songlines.

Band members
Tello-Trumpet, Organ
Nelson Dilation-DJ
Tony Marrison-Bass, other random instruments
Maria João Branco-Vocals
Matt Tweed-Sitar, Bodhrán, other random instruments
"Sam"-Percussion and bubbles

Albums
2003 - Lost In Spice
2016 - Lebanon Elevator

External links
Official Site
Whirl-y-Gig

World fusion groups
Trip hop groups
British electronic music groups